Goneatara is a genus of North American dwarf spiders that was first described by S. C. Bishop & C. R. Crosby in 1935.

Species
 it contains four species, found in the United States:
Goneatara eranistes (Crosby & Bishop, 1927) – USA
Goneatara nasutus (Barrows, 1943) – USA
Goneatara platyrhinus (Crosby & Bishop, 1927) (type) – USA
Goneatara plausibilis Bishop & Crosby, 1935 – USA

See also
 List of Linyphiidae species (A–H)

References

Araneomorphae genera
Linyphiidae
Spiders of the United States